is a passenger railway station located in  Nishi-ku, Yokohama, Kanagawa Prefecture, Japan, operated by the private railway company Keikyū.

Lines
Tobe Station is served by the Keikyū Main Line and is located 23.4 kilometers from the terminus of the line at Shinagawa  Station in Tokyo.

Station layout
The station consists of a single elevated island platform serving two tracks, with the station building underneath. The platform is short, and the station can accommodate only six-car long trains.

Platforms

History
Tobe Station was opened on 26 December 1931.

Keikyū introduced station numbering to its stations on 21 October 2010; Tobe Station was assigned station number KK38.

Passenger statistics
In fiscal 2019, the station was used by an average of 16,841 passengers daily. 

The passenger figures for previous years are as shown below.

Surrounding area
 Nishi Ward Office
 Japan National Route 1

See also
 List of railway stations in Japan

References

External links

 

Railway stations in Kanagawa Prefecture
Railway stations in Japan opened in 1931
Keikyū Main Line
Railway stations in Yokohama